"Merry Christmas Baby" is an R&B Christmas standard credited to Lou Baxter and Johnny Moore. In 1947, Johnny Moore's Three Blazers recorded the tune, featuring vocals and piano by Charles Brown. Subsequently, many performers have recorded renditions of the song, including Chuck Berry, James Brown, Ike & Tina Turner, Otis Redding, B.B. King, Elvis Presley, Bruce Springsteen, Christina Aguilera, and Melissa Etheridge.

Background 

Charles Brown tells the story of the song this way: 

And Johnny Moore did the deal with Lou Baxter and put his own name on it as well, apparently.

Johnny Moore's Three Blazers was one of the hottest blues attractions on the West Coast when their recording of "Merry Christmas Baby" reached number three on Billboard's R&B Juke Box chart during the Christmas season of 1947. Moore, a guitarist, was accompanied by Brown, bassist Eddie Williams and guitarist Oscar Moore (Johnny's brother, then a member of the King Cole Trio).

Brown went on to record many versions of the song throughout his career for various labels, including a popular version in 1956, originally released by Aladdin Records.

Renditions
Rock and roll pioneer Chuck Berry recorded a version of "Merry Christmas Baby". In 1958, Chess Records released it as single from the album St. Louis to Liverpool, which reached number 71 on the Billboard Hot 100

In 1971 Elvis Presley recorded a blues version for his album Elvis Sings The Wonderful World of Christmas as well as a single. It was recorded as an 8-minute version but was whittled down to 5:44 on the album.

References 

1947 songs
1958 singles
American Christmas songs
Chuck Berry songs
Bruce Springsteen songs
Chess Records singles